The Hamaguchi Cabinet is the 27th Cabinet of Japan led by Hamaguchi Osachi from July 2, 1929 to April 14, 1931.

Cabinet

References 

Cabinet of Japan
1929 establishments in Japan
Cabinets established in 1929
Cabinets disestablished in 1931